1952 is a year in the Gregorian calendar.

1952 may also refer to:
1952 (album), a 1995 album by Soul-Junk
1952: Ivan i Aleksandra, original title of Bulgarian film Ivan and Alexandra
1952 Hesburgh, an asteroid
1952 TM, alternative name for 14 Irene, an asteroid
 1952 BC, a year in the 20th century BC